Climate change in Spain has caused temperatures to rise in the last few decades and has caused more frequency in heatwaves annually.

Greenhouse gas emissions 

The annual C02 emissions in 2019 were 252.68 million tonnes, the per capita CO2 emissions were 7.1 tonnes in 2019. Spain accounts for 9% of the total CO2 emissions in the European Union and the CO2 emissions were down 27% in 2019 compared to 2005 levels which is higher than the EU average.

Impacts on the natural environment

Temperature and weather changes 

The temperature has risen by 1.5 degrees Celsius between 1965 and 2015. According Aemet the frequency of heatwaves have doubled since 2010, the frequency of heatwaves between 1980-2000 were 10 to 12 heatwaves per decade. Between 2010-2020 the number of heatwaves was 24. The duration of heatwaves will be longer, with at least 41 days of extreme heat in 2050 and 50 days in the worst emissions scenario. Compared to heatwaves in 1971-2000 when the average number of days were 21 days annually. 

Spain has the highest risk of desertification in the EU. 75% of Spain is already considered dry or semi-arid. Around 20% of Spain is already desertified, another 1% is endanger if becoming desertified mainly because of agricultural practices.

Water resources 
The annual precipitation was 601.20mm between 1991 and 2020, the annual precipitation will decrease by 64.52mm in 2040-2059.

Impacts on people

Health impacts 
Between 1998 and 2012 3,669 people died annually because of heatwaves, between 2035-2064 that number could be 14,531 deaths annually in the worst case scenario. Between 2070-2099 that number could be 30,443 deaths annually also in the worst case scenario.

Mitigation and adaptation

Policies and legislation 
The Spanish parliament approved a law on climate change and energy transition in 2021. The law says that there will be a 23% reduction of emissions in 2030 compared to 1990 levels and to become carbon neutral in 2050. In 2025 coal-fired power plants will shut down. Spain plans to only allow car sales of electric vehicles in 2040.

See also 
 Plug-in electric vehicles in Spain

References 

Climate of Spain
 
Spain